Ella is an unincorporated community in Jefferson County, in the U.S. state of Pennsylvania.

History
A post office was established at Ella in 1886, and remained in operation until 1907. Ella M. Painter served as an early postmaster.

References

Unincorporated communities in Jefferson County, Pennsylvania
Unincorporated communities in Pennsylvania